The 2001 Virginia Attorney General election was held on November 6, 2001, to elect the next attorney general of Virginia. The Republican nominee, Jerry Kilgore, defeated the Democratic nominee, Donald McEachin, by around 20 points.

General election

Candidates
Jerry Kilgore (R)
Donald McEachin (D)

Results

References

Attorney General
2001
Virginia